New Blackfriars is an academic journal published by John Wiley & Sons that is formally linked with the English Province of the Order of Preachers (also known as the Dominican Order).

The journal was launched in 1920 as a monthly review called Blackfriars: A Monthly Review Edited by the English Dominicans; for a period it also contained The Catholic Review, which, together with the Hawkesyard Review, Blackfriars superseded.  It was published under its original name until 1965, when it was renamed New Blackfriars.

References

External links 
 

English-language journals
Publications established in 1920
Catholic studies journals
Wiley-Blackwell academic journals
Bimonthly journals